Probezzia is a genus of biting midges in the family Ceratopogonidae. There are at least 20 described species in Probezzia.

Species
These 28 species belong to the genus Probezzia:

 Probezzia albitibia Wirth, 1971 i c g b
 Probezzia albiventris (Loew, 1861) i c g
 Probezzia atriventris Wirth, 1951 i c g
 Probezzia bottimeri Wirth, 1971 i c g
 Probezzia concinna (Meigen, 1818) i c g
 Probezzia fairchildi Wirth, 1994 c g
 Probezzia fiscipennis Wirth, 1971 c g
 Probezzia flavonigra (Coquillett, 1905) i c g
 Probezzia fuscipennis Wirth, 1971 i c g
 Probezzia glicki Wirth, 1994 c g
 Probezzia infuscata Malloch, 1915 i c g b
 Probezzia jamnbacki Wirth, 1971 i c g
 Probezzia ludoviciana Wirth, 1951 i c g
 Probezzia manshurica Remm, 1993 c g
 Probezzia meadi Wirth, 1994 c g
 Probezzia nigra Wirth, 1971 i c g
 Probezzia pallida Malloch, 1914 i c g b
 Probezzia rosewalli Wirth, 1951 i c g
 Probezzia sabroskyi Wirth, 1951 i c g
 Probezzia seminigra (Panzer, 1798) i c g
 Probezzia smithii (Coquillett, 1901) i c g
 Probezzia soikai (Harant & Huttel, 1952) c g
 Probezzia sugiyamai (Tokunaga, 1940) c g
 Probezzia unica (Johannsen, 1934) i c g
 Probezzia weemsi Wirth, 1994 c g
 Probezzia williamsi Wirth, 1971 i c g
 Probezzia wirthi Spinelli & Grogan, 1997 c g
 Probezzia xanthogaster (Kieffer, 1917) i c g b

Data sources: i = ITIS, c = Catalogue of Life, g = GBIF, b = Bugguide.net

References

Further reading

External links

 

Ceratopogonidae
Articles created by Qbugbot
Chironomoidea genera